Dominion Reptilian is the first album by the Swedish melodic death metal band Hearse.

Track listing
 "Dominion Reptilian"  - 03:50
 "Torch"  - 04:43
 "Cosmic Daughter"  - 04:14
 "Contemplation"  - 04:43
 "Rapture In Twilight"  - 04:53
 "Well Of Youth"  - 04:10
 "Abandoned"  - 03:30
 "End Of Days"  - 04:43
 "So Vague"  - 08:42

Bonus tracks
 "The Unknown"  - 4:46*
 "Avalon"  - 4:00*

"The Unknown" and "Avalon" are bonus tracks on the digipak version.

2003 debut albums
Hearse (band) albums
Hammerheart Records albums